Amorese Ralph Dertin (born 29 January 1991) is a Central African footballer who plays as a midfielder for AS Pélican and the Central African Republic national team.

Club career
Dertin debuted with the Central African Republic national team in a 3–2 Central African Games win over Chad on 3 October 2010.

References

External links
 
 

1991 births
Living people
People from Bangui
Central African Republic footballers
Central African Republic international footballers
Association football midfielders
Gabon Championnat National D1 players
Elite One players
Central African Republic expatriate footballers
Central African Republic expatriate sportspeople in Gabon
Expatriate footballers in Gabon
Central African Republic expatriate sportspeople in Cameroon
Expatriate footballers in Cameroon